Long Island Jewish Medical Center (LIJMC or LIJ) is a clinical and academic hospital within the Northwell Health system. It is a 807-bed, non-profit tertiary care teaching hospital serving the greater New York metropolitan area.

LIJMC has three components: Long Island Jewish Hospital, Steven & Alexandra Cohen Children's Medical Center of New York, and The Zucker Hillside Hospital. Long Island Jewish Hospital is a 587-bed tertiary adult care hospital with advanced diagnostic and treatment technology, and modern facilities for medical, surgical, dental and obstetrical care.  As a primary teaching hospital for the Donald and Barbara Zucker School of Medicine at Hofstra/Northwell (along with North Shore University Hospital) and the Hofstra Northwell School of Nursing and Physician Assistant Studies Island Campus for the Albert Einstein College of Medicine, LIJMC's graduate medical education program is one of the largest in New York State, and programs are in divisions headed by full-time faculty.

LIJ's full-time staff includes more than 500 physicians, who supervise care in all major specialties and participate in the medical center's teaching and research programs.

The medical center is located on the southeast side of North Shore Towers.

The center was founded in 1954 by a group of nine philanthropists, including Jacob H. Horwitz.

Notable people

Notable births 

 April 12, 1961: Willi Ninja; dancer and choreographer.
November 16, 1986: Omar Mateen; terrorist and perpetrator of the Orlando nightclub shooting.

Notable deaths
 September 14, 1992: Leon J. Davis; Polish-American labor leader who co-founded 1199SEIU United Healthcare Workers East.
February 11, 1994; Saul Weprin; attorney and politician who was Speaker of the New York State Assembly.
November 13, 1998; Red Holzman; basketball player and coach.
June 25, 1999: Fred Trump; real estate developer and father of the 45th President of the United States, Donald Trump.

Notable employees 

 Sean Kenniff ; 4-year residency and chief resident
 Harold S. Koplewicz; Chief of child and adolescent psychiatry
 Dr. Sandra Lindsay DHSc, MS, MBA, RN, CCRN-K, NE-BC; First person in the U.S. to get the COVID-19 vaccine.

Transportation
The MTA's  bus stops inside the hospital. In addition, the  express buses to Manhattan all stop near LIJ.

References

External links 

Teaching hospitals in New York (state)
Jews and Judaism in Queens, New York
Jews and Judaism in Nassau County, New York
Jewish medical organizations
Yeshiva University
Glen Oaks, Queens
1954 establishments in New York (state)
Voluntary hospitals
Hospitals in Queens, New York
Hospitals established in 1954